Karimabad (also Romanized as Karīmābād) is a village in Bahadoran Rural District, in the Central District of Mehriz County, Yazd Province, Iran. At the 2006 census, its population was 1,119, in 273 families.

References 

Populated places in Mehriz County